The Robert Heinlein Omnibus is an anthology of science fiction published in 1958, containing a novel, a novella and a short story by American writer Robert A. Heinlein:
 Beyond This Horizon (1942)
 The Man Who Sold The Moon (1950)
 The Green Hills of Earth (1947)

References

1958 short story collections
Short story collections by Robert A. Heinlein